Sohaib Maqsood (Punjabi, ; born 15 April 1987) is a Pakistani cricketer. 

Due to his aggressive batting style and his 6’2'’ stature he's often compared to former Pakistan captain and batsman as well fellow Multan native Inzamam-ul-Haq.

Domestic career
He plays for the domestic team Multan Tigers in Haier T20 Cup and United Bank of Pakistan in Quaid-i-Azam Trophy. He led Pakistan A team in 5 unofficial One Day Internationals against UAE.

In April 2018, he was named the vice-captain of Federal Areas' squad for the 2018 Pakistan Cup. He was the leading run-scorer for Multan in the 2018–19 National T20 Cup, with 207 runs in seven matches. In March 2019, he was named in Federal Areas' squad for the 2019 Pakistan Cup.

In September 2019, he was named in Southern Punjab's squad for the 2019–20 Quaid-e-Azam Trophy tournament. His average in T20 internationals is 14.

International career
He made his ODI debut for Pakistan against South Africa on 8 November 2013 and scored 56 runs off 54 balls. His squad number is 92, which he chose as a personal tribute to the winning Pakistan team of the 1992 Cricket World Cup.

In September 2021, he was named in Pakistan's squad for the 2021 ICC Men's T20 World Cup. In November 2021, he was selected to play for the Dambulla Giants following the players' draft for the 2021 Lanka Premier League.

References

External links
 

Pakistani cricketers
1987 births
Living people
Punjab (Pakistan) cricketers
Pakistan One Day International cricketers
Pakistan Twenty20 International cricketers
Cricketers at the 2015 Cricket World Cup
Baluchistan cricketers
Lahore Qalandars cricketers
Peshawar Zalmi cricketers
United Bank Limited cricketers
Water and Power Development Authority cricketers
Punjabi people
Cricketers from Multan
Multan Sultans cricketers
Multan cricketers
Southern Punjab (Pakistan) cricketers